is a Japanese football player. She plays for Nojima Stella Kanagawa Sagamihara and Japan national team.

Club career
Takagi was born in Mishima on May 21, 1993. After graduating from Waseda University, she joined Nojima Stella Kanagawa Sagamihara in 2016.

National team career
Hikari played for Japan U-17 national team at 2010 U-17 World Cup Japan won 2nd place and U-20 team at 2012 U-20 World Cup Japan won 3rd place. On June 5, 2016, she debuted for Japan national team against United States. She was a member of Japan for 2018 Asian Cup and Japan won the championship. She played 19 games and scored 1 goal for Japan until 2018.

National team statistics

References

External links

Japan Football Association

1993 births
Living people
Waseda University alumni
Association football people from Shizuoka Prefecture
Japanese women's footballers
Japan women's international footballers
Nadeshiko League players
Nojima Stella Kanagawa Sagamihara players
Women's association football defenders
Footballers at the 2018 Asian Games
Asian Games gold medalists for Japan
Asian Games medalists in football
Medalists at the 2018 Asian Games